Laurie Ayton Snr (1884 – 27 October 1962) was a Scottish golfer. He was a descendant of William Ayton, one of the eleven founders of St Andrews Golf Club in about 1843. He served as club captain in 1953. He was the son of David Ayton, Sr. His son, Laurie Ayton Jnr, was on the 1949 Ryder Cup team.

Ayton finished in the top-10 in eight majors with his best finish being 4th at the 1910 Open Championship.

Results in major championships

Note: Ayton never played in the Masters Tournament.

NYF = tournament not yet founded
NT = no tournament
WD = withdrew
CUT = missed the half-way cut
R64, R32, R16, QF, SF = round in which player lost in PGA Championship match play
"T" indicates a tie for a place

Team appearances
England–Scotland Professional Match (representing Scotland): 1910, 1912 (tie), 1913, 1933, 1934

References

Scottish male golfers
Golfers from St Andrews
1884 births
1962 deaths